Hey Prabhu! is a 2019 Hindi-language comedy web series directed by Shashanka Ghosh for MX Player. The series stars Rajat Barmecha, Parul Gulati, Ritu Raj Singh, Achint Kaur, Sheeba Chaddha and Prynca Talukdar. It is written by Nihit Bhave and produced by Sanket Kunde. The series was premiered on February 20, 2019, on MX Player. The second season of Hey Prabhu! was released on March 26, 2021.

Plot 
The web series is based on a story that revolves around a boy named Tarun Prabhu (played by Rajat Barmecha), who is in his mid-20s with a strong fan following on social media platform, Twitter. Tarun soon realizes that online popularity is not enough to overcome real-life situations. Mita (played by Achint Kaur) and Arunima (played by Parul Gulati) hate Tarun's reckless behaviour and make his life difficult at work. Arunima (played by Parul Gulati), Mita's senior correspondent, who assists Tarun. His social life gets disturbed when everyone gets to know that he is suffering from erectile dysfunction. The title is a pun on Hey Prabhu, (Oh God), a common opening for Hindi prayers and poems.

Cast 
 Rajat Barmecha as Tarun Prabhu
 Sheeba Chaddha as Tarun's mom
 Rituraj Singh as Ishwar Prabhu (Tarun's father)
 Neha Panda as Rimjhim
 Vaishnavi Rao as Ira
 Ashish Bhatia as Aarambh
 Parul Gulati as Arunima
 Achint Kaur as Mita
 Raj Bhansali as Tejpal
 Pryanca Talukdar as Karishma
 Shashwat Mukherjee as Sumanta
 Devdutt Daani as ChaarMinaar

Marketing and release 
The web series's official trailer was launched February 13, 2019, by MX Player on YouTube. It is streaming on OTT Platform MX Player from February 20, 2019. The second season was released on March 26, 2021 on MX Player platform.

Piracy 
All the episodes of the series were leaked by the bootleg website Tamil Rockers within a week of release.

Reception 
Sakshma Srivastav of Times Now gave three-and-a-half of five, saying, "What I liked about the show is one, it's entertaining plot and two, it's natural performances. There is a lot of situational comedy and drama." D.Krishna Prasad, writing for IWMBuzz gave 3.5 out of 5 stars and said, "The overall package, in terms of acting, script, background work, is really good. It is depicted in a natural and powerful way. It features an interesting real life story and a script well written by Nihit Bhave. The main reason why it seemed more realistic was because the series adopted a hilarious and funny way to show Rajat Barmecha's problem in a comical way, even while it touched upon the real aspects of today’s generation." TheDigitalHash.com stated, "Hey Prabhu is one of the rare web series that has an intelligent script and wants to handle the protagonist's personal as well as work-life with crackling speed and laser-sharp precision."

References

External links 
 

2020 Indian television series debuts
MX Player original programming
Hindi-language web series
Indian web series
Indian action television series
Indian comedy television series